Jenő Apáthy (29 June 1883 – 17 July 1959) was a Hungarian foil and sabre fencer. He competed at the Athina 1906 and London 1908 Summer Olympics.

References

External links
 

1883 births
1959 deaths
Hungarian male foil fencers
Hungarian male sabre fencers
Olympic fencers of Hungary
Fencers at the 1906 Intercalated Games
Fencers at the 1908 Summer Olympics